The 1955 Copa del Generalísimo was the 53rd staging of the Spanish Cup. The competition began on 17 April 1955 and concluded on 5 June 1955 with the final.

Round of 16

|}
Tiebreaker

|}
Bye: Real Madrid CF and CF Barcelona.

Quarter-finals

|}

Semi-finals

|}

Final

|}

External links
 rsssf.com
 linguasport.com

1955
1954–55 in Spanish football